Buraydah ibn al-Husayb was a Sahabi, one of the companions of Muhammad, and one of the leading persons of the Banu Aslam.

References

Companions of the Prophet